is a 2011 Japanese film directed by Nobuhiro Yamashita, director of Linda Linda Linda. It is based on Saburo Kawamoto's true life account.

The film was featured at the 2011 (30th) Vancouver International Film Festival, the 2011 (16th) Busan International Film Festival  and the 2011 (55th) BFI London Film Festival.

Plot 
The film follows the story of  Sawada (played by Satoshi Tsumabuki) joining a left wing magazine as a gonzo journalist in 1969. He is taken under the wing of the editor, and goes to interview Umeyama (Kenichi Matsuyama), who is developing a reputation as a radical -  an activist intent on making a violent demonstration. However, Umeyama may not be exactly who he says he is. The film follows the two characters involvement in the political activist world of 1960s/70s Japan.

Cast 
 Satoshi Tsumabuki
 Kenichi Matsuyama
 Yuya Matsuura as Tomotsu
 Munetaka Aoki as Christ 
 Hiroshi Yamamoto as Hitoshi Saeki
 Takeshi Yamamoto as Kiyohara, 
 Hideki Nakano as Tsugawa, 
 Daikichi Sugawara as Kobayashi

Awards 
Sponichi Grand Prix Newcomer Award (Shiori Kutsuna) - 2011 (66th) Mainichi Film Awards - January 18, 2012

References

External links 
 

Films directed by Nobuhiro Yamashita
2011 films
2010s Japanese-language films
2010s Japanese films